Ali Bouyahiaoui is a Boumerdès residential, administrative and commercial neighbourhood located in the commune of Boumerdès in Kabylia.

Description 
The neighbourhood "Ali Bouyahiaoui", is a residential, administrative and commercial zone of the city of Boumerdès.

History 
The neighbourhood was created by on 1978, as part of the development of the city of Boumerdès.

Location

Gallery

External links

References 

Ali Bouyahiaoui Neighbourhood
Neighbourhood of Boumerdès
Neighbourhoods in Algeria
Boumerdès
Boumerdès Province
Populated places in Boumerdès Province
Kabylie
Geography of Boumerdès